The Mergellina Funicular (Italian: Funicolare di Mergellina), is one of four operating funiculars in the public transportion system of Naples, Italy. The system is a true funicular: an inclined railway with two passenger cars, connected via cables, operating in concert.

Opened in 1931, the Mergellina Funicular is Naples' fourth and most recent funicular.

The funicular connects its upper terminus in the Posillipo Alto neighborhood with its lower terminus in Mergellina via five stations: Manzoni, Parco Angelina, San Gioacchino, San Antonio and Mergellina. Unlike Naples' other three funiculars with upper terminals near Piazza Vanvitelli in Vomero, the Mergellina line is located farther to the northwest. It runs uphill from the marina at Mergellina Sanazzarro to Manzoni, close to the Line 6 of the Naples Metro.

The Chiaia, Central and Montesanto funiculars connect nearby lower areas of Naples to the high neighborhood of Vomero.  A now defunct system, the Sorrento Funicular, operated nearby from 1883 to 1886.

History
In the early 20th century, Naples' urban expansion spread toward the northwestern hills, with new residential neighbourhoods on Posillipo hill. To facilitate easier access into the area, construction commenced on the funicular in the late 1920s, and it began service with delays or construction complications on 24 May 1931.

The funicular operated without problem through World War II and for much of the immediate post-war period. By the early 1980s, the now aging line experienced problems due to its uninterrupted use and began having regular service disruptions. While the line remained popular, it did not generate revenue that could finance its overhaul, and its operators transferred management over to regional authorities.

Modernization commenced in May 1985, with new electronic and mechanical components, operation controls, transmissions and safety systems installed. The overhauled line reopened on 16 January 1986 after a seven-month closure. The line closed briefly between May 1989 and March 1990 for an overhaul to the rail and traction systems, in time for Naples to host the 1990 FIFA World Cup.

In 1999, the Campania Regional Management Committee transferred management of the Mergellina Funicular to Azienda Napoletana Mobilità (ANM - Neapolitan Mobility Agency), who were by then responsible for running the four funiculars in Naples. As with the other three, ANM was replaced as the operator on 1 February 2001 by Metronapoli, who began a process of better integrating the various elements of rail transport within Naples, creating better interchanges and connections.  ANM took over Metronapoli in November 2013, thereby again becoming the Mergellina Funicular's operator.

After numerous stoppages since 2016 due to workforce issues, ANM closed the system in October 2020, because of COVID-19 complications. The Mergellina funicular remained out of service, well into 2021, ostensibly replaced by a six-day per week bus shuttle.

Operation
The Mergellina Funicular carries a quarter of a million passengers annually, with an average of 3,200 passengers on workdays and 2,000 on weekends and holidays, making it the least used of Naples' funiculars. Each train can carry 60 passengers, giving a capacity of 480 passengers per hour in each direction.

Stations

See also
 List of Naples metro stations
 List of rapid transit systems
 List of funicular railways

References

External links
 Official site of the Metropolitana di Naples 
 Urbanrail.net Naples rail website
 Railways and metro station of Naples 

Metre gauge railways in Italy
Transport in Naples
Railway lines in Campania
Naples
Railway lines opened in 1931